The 1914 New Zealand general election was held on 10 December to elect a total of 80 MPs to the 19th session of the New Zealand Parliament. The Maori vote was held on 11 December. A total number of 616,043 voters were registered, of which 84.7% voters turned out to vote.

The election saw William Massey's Reform Government maintain power.

The second-ballot voting system had been repealed in 1913, and first-past-the-post voting reinstated for the 1914 election.

Soldiers serving overseas in the NZEF were given a vote by the Expeditionary Forces Voting Act, 1914. They voted for a party (Liberal, Labour or Reform) and their votes were allocated to a candidate for their electorate by a representative of their party; which sometimes required the representative to choose between rival "Liberal" or "Labour" candidates.

Summary of results

Party totals

Auckland West, Hawke's Bay, Taumarunui, Wairarapa, Waitaki and Wellington Central were won by the Liberals from Reform
Chalmers, Dunedin West, Motueka, and Northern Maori were won by Reform from the Liberals
Nelson was won by Reform from an independent.
Otaki was won by Reform from the Social Democrats.
Dunedin North was won by United Labour from Reform
Four electorates replaced their incumbent MP with another from the same party: Christchurch East and Temuka (Liberal), Eden and Wellington Suburbs and Country (Reform).

Votes summary

Results
The following are the results of the 1914 general election:

Key

|-
 |colspan=8 style="background-color:#FFDEAD" | General electorates
|-

|-
 |colspan=8 style="background-color:#FFDEAD" | Māori electorates
|-

|}

References

See also
Politics of New Zealand
Elections in New Zealand